Troll Tales is a Danish-German animated series from 1999 based on the books of Henning Kure. It involves three young trolls called Snapper, Tumbler and Willy Wee.

The series has been dubbed into English, German, Danish, Swedish, Norwegian, Finnish, Hungarian, Russian and Dutch. It aired in Scandinavia on Cartoon Network, Boomerang and DR1, in Germany on ZDF and KiKA, in Hungary on Duna TV and in Belgium on Ketnet. All music was composed, performed and produced by John Mitchell and Tom Keenlyside at Anitunes Music Inc.

All episodes were released on DVD in Russia with Russian and English audio tracks.

Plot 
Join the adventures of the three young trolls Snapper, Tumbler, and willy Wee, as they explore the magical Troll forest and in their own unique way - make sure that the elves, nixes and other faerie folk will never forget (not forgive them). The Trolls are an anarchistic lot, always on the lookout for fun. They never realise what havoc they wreak, nor do they care. They are mischievous but harmless. Everyone in the magical forest knows our three heroes by the pranks they play and the adventures they share.

Episodes 
 Soap Opera
 The Hunt
 The Lord of the Stones
 The Princess
 The Baby-Sitters
 Farm Boys
 The Mermaid
 Say Cheese!
 Pocket Storm
 Huldra's Revenge
 False Alarm
 Where's the Wolf
 One Cold Fish
 The Bride of the Nix
 Wrathrag's Request
 The Changelings
 The Wand
 Huldra's Nightmare
 The Bog Hag
 Three Wishes
 The Highway Man
 The Trouble with Trolls
 In a Dragon's Breath
 The Professor
 Sunsick
 The Uninvited

Characters

Snapper 
Voiced by Kathleen Barr. Snapper is a rather scrawny, barefoot, troll child from a forest filled of magic creatures.
He is generally pretty disliked by just about everyone in the forest due to the constant pranks he plays on anyone he comes across. He is very cunning (although he might seem dumb, as he cannot even count to two!). He is also a master at every kind of music instrument he learns the basics off (He learned to play violin like a pro just like "Snap!"), but favours the flute. While he generally doesn't care about the consequences of his actions, he often resolves bad situations he played a part in instigating. He has a little troll named Willy Wee living in his hat. He has a really big ego. Unlike the other trolls, Snapper goes barefoot.

Tumbler 
Voiced by Cathy Weseluck. Tumbler is a fat little troll child. He is rather dull and mostly just tags along with Snapper, agrees with him, when he compliments himself, and takes part in his pranks. He is rather shy.

Willy Wee 
Willy Wee is a naked nano-troll (a tiny troll). He doesn't like any of the creatures in the forest that much, except Snapper, Sun-Eye, Tim, and Huldra.

Sun Eye 
A boy who thinks he's a troll.

Supporting characters

Gecko 
Gecko is a big-eyed troll with tamed crows called, Jeremy, Pascal, and many more.

Huldra 
Voiced by Lalainia Lindbjerg. Huldra is a (self-appointed, the other vittlings doesn't thinks she's ready yet, "The Hunt doesn't call her") huntress of the Vittling Folk (They seem to be some kind of troll-elfish creatures...). Huldra is the laughing stock of her tribe, being kinda clumsy (while still being just as agile as any other vittling), and short-thinking sometimes, as well as being one of Snappers main targets for pranks. She yearns to prove that she can be just as good a hunter as the adult Vittlings (though she is a kid). She seems to have some kind of liking for Snapper, as she enjoyed kissing him just to see his reaction, as well getting pretty jealous when a mermaid flirted with him.

Scuttlebutt 
Huldra's pet moose/elk. He is very gluttonous and has a sweet tooth. He is also rather dumb.

Trollmum 
A troll woman who desperately wants children and will even steal human children.

Gnarlyconk 
Voiced by Michael Dobson. Gnarlyconk is a short-tempered troll who is Snapper's nemesis.

Flobbergob 
Voiced By Scott McNeil.
One of the trolls.

Rumbletum 
Voiced by Michael Dobson. Rumbletum is a dim-witted troll. He has a problem of passing gas.

Wrathrag 
The resident troll witch. She makes and mixes potions in her hallow tree. She has a pet owl that acts as her eyes.

Strix 
Wrathrag's giant owl companion.

Antagonists

The Wolf 
A creature who seeks to devour the hero

The Nix 
Voiced by Michael Dobson. An aquatic spirit feared by many of the forest's inhabitants. He dwells in a castle in the lake. He enchants people with false promises and wishes so that he can keep them there forever.

The Mara 
A wicked witch that spreads nightmares.

The Mermaid 
A beautiful creature from the sea. She gets lost in the troll river and falls in love with Snapper. After she successfully seduced Snapper, she transformed him into a sea troll.

Danish children's animated television series
German children's animated television series